"Guilty as Charged" is the third single from Gym Class Heroes' fourth full-length album, The Quilt.

It was released for digital download release on December 1, 2008 in the UK, it features UK R&B singer Estelle singing the chorus and a go-go beat for backing.

It was added to BBC Radio 1's C-List on November 12, 2008. The song failed to chart inside the UK singles chart but did chart at #9 on the official R&B chart.

Charts

References

2008 singles
Gym Class Heroes songs
Estelle (musician) songs
Go-go songs
2008 songs
Fueled by Ramen singles